Chiplun Assembly constituency is one of the 288 Vidhan Sabha (legislative assembly) constituencies of Maharashtra state in western India.

Overview
Chiplun constituency is one of the five Vidhan Sabha constituencies located in Ratnagiri district. It comprises parts of the Chiplun and Sangameshwar tehsils of the district.

Chiplun is part of the Ratnagiri-Sindhudurg Lok Sabha constituency along with five other Vidhan Sabha segments, namely Ratnagiri and Rajapur in Ratnagiri district and Kankavli, Kudal and Sawantwadi in Sindhudurg district.

Members of Legislative Assembly

Election results

Maharashtra Assembly Elections 2004

Maharashtra Assembly Elections 2009

Maharashtra Assembly Elections 2014

See also
 Chiplun
 List of constituencies of Maharashtra Vidhan Sabha
 Walope

References

Assembly constituencies of Maharashtra